Lania may refer to:

Łania, Kuyavian-Pomeranian Voivodeship, Poland
Laneia, a village in Cyprus
"-lania", a suffix used in taxonomy.